Rima Salah is currently the chair of the Early Childhood Peace Consortium (ECPC) and is an assistant clinical professor at the Child Study Center, Yale School of Medicine.

She is also an appointed member to the international advisory council of the Academic University College for Nonviolence and Human Rights in Beirut, Lebanon. Salah also sits on the board of directors at Women for Women International, the Global Network for Women Peacebuilders, and Cure Violence Global.

She is also a member of the Secretary-General High-Level Panel on Peace Operations.

Early life and education
Salah is a national of Jordan and speaks three languages, Arabic, English, and French. She holds a Ph.D. in cultural anthropology from SUNY-Binghamton. During her doctoral program, Salah spent one year in Baqa’a Palestinian Refugee Camp near Amman, Jordan while she conducted research for her PhD dissertation that examined the changing status of three generations of Palestinian women in refugee camps pertaining to education and public/community participation.

Salah also holds master's degrees in education and sociology and cultural anthropology from SUNY-Fredonia, and an undergraduate degree in sociology and social work from Beirut College for Women-Lebanon (now known as the Lebanese American University).

Prior to her international advocacy work for the rights of children and women, Salah began her career as a teacher in the Jordanian Government Public School System in 1965. Upon leaving the teaching profession, Salah worked for the Catholic Relief Services in Jerusalem as a supervisor of social workers for the organization's Humanitarian Programs for Refugees and Displaced People from 1967 to 1975.

From 1972 to 1987, Salah spent time lecturing on numerous topics, such as, social work, sociology, psychology, and Arabic across several institutions and organizations, including the School of Social work at Dar al-Tifl al-Arabi in Jerusalem, the Swedish Organization of Individual Relief in Jerusalem, the State University of New York at Binghamton, and Binghamton Community College in Binghamton, New York.

Careers in diplomacy, peace-building, children’s rights, and women rights

United Nations positions 
Salah has had nearly 30 years of professional service in the United Nations. She joined UNICEF in 1987 as Head of Office in Baluchistan, Pakistan. After five years in Pakistan, Salah became the UNICEF Representative in Ouagadougou, Burkina Faso from 1992 to 1995 and the UNICEF representative in Hanoi, Vietnam, from 1995 to 1999.

From 1999 to 2004 she was UNICEF's regional director for West and Central Africa, responsible for UNICEF's work in 23 African countries. Between 2004 and 2007 she was deputy executive director of UNICEF, based in New York City. She was deputy special representative of the Secretary-General at the United Nations Mission in the Central African Republic and Chad from 2008 to 2010. Salah returned to UNICEF New York headquarters from 2011 to 2012 as the deputy executive director, officer-in-charge for external relations.

United Nations High-Level Independent Panel on Peace Operations 
On October 31, 2014, Salah, along with two additional women experts in the field of peace-building, children rights and women's rights, Dr. Marie-Louise Baricak and Dr. Radhika Coomaraswamy, were appointed by then Secretary-General of the United Nations Ban Ki-moon to join the 14 members of the United Nations High-Level Independent Panel on Peace Operations. Secretary-General Ban Ki-moon summoned this panel “to undertake a thorough review of United Nations peace operations today and the emerging needs of the future” and “take a comprehensive look at how United Nations peace operations could continue to contribute to the prevention and resolution of conflicts and be best designed and equipped to deal with the challenges of tomorrow.” The United Nations Entity for Gender Equality and the Empowerment of Women, also known as UN Women, praised the expansion of the panel, stating that “These three additional panelists will together bring broad regional and relevant subject matter experience, and will complement the work of the other Panel members” and “ensure[s] that gender equality and women, peace and security elements are highlighted throughout” the panel's review.

In May 2016, Salah along with the other members of the UN High-Level Independent Panel on Peace Operations presented the results of their six-month evaluation at the 70th General Assembly on Peace and Security at the United Nations.

Early Childhood Peace Consortium (ECPC) 
In 2012, Salah played a key role in the inception of the Early Childhood Peace Consortium (ECPC) as a co-founder. The ECPC is a network that serves as a unified body of stakeholders across sectors, including civil society, the media, government officials, philanthropic foundations, and organizations as well as practitioners and academics, who champion peace-building and violence prevention through an Early Childhood Development (ECD) agenda.

Salah along with ECPC member Dr. James F. Leckman, and professor of anthropology, health, and global affairs at Yale University,  and ECPC expert consultant Dr. Catherine Panter-Brick, co-edited the book “Pathways to peace: The transformative power of children and families.” The book was ground-breaking in that it contained 19 chapters that featured 41 international experts that “investigat[ed] the way that children are raised as a critical factor that can inform a community’s tendency toward peace versus conflict.”

In October 2015, two years after the ECPC's global launch at the United Nations headquarters in New York City, the ECPC formalized its governance structure. Salah was elected as the ECPC's inaugural chair.

Under Salah's leadership, the ECPC expanded membership involvement in the day-to-day operations of the consortium by overseeing the establishment of several working groups in the areas of communications and advocacy, research, and youth leadership in addition to several task forces which include topics related to governance, finance, and COVID-19. Additionally, the ECPC launched its global online platform in 2018 which provides a variety of resources related to early childhood development and peace-building as well as highlights the work in these areas by ECPC members.

In addition to expanding internal operations, the ECPC has increased its global presence under Salah's leadership. On December 23, 2016, a new UN Resolution on the “Follow-up to the Declaration and Programme of Action on a Culture of Peace” recognized the ECPC with the direction of ECPC member Ambassador (See also Culture of Peace). The resolution lauded:“the practical initiatives and actions by relevant United Nations bodies, including the United Nations Children’s Fund, the United Nations Entity for Gender Equality and the Empowerment of Women (UN-Women) and the University for Peace, as well as their activities in further promoting a culture of peace and non-violence, in particular the promotion of peace education and activities related to specific areas identified in the Programme of Action, and encourages them to continue and further strengthen and expand their efforts, and in this context notes with appreciation the global launch of the United Nations Children’s Fund Early Childhood Peace Consortium in September 2013 and its activities, including those for vulnerable children."

Notable accomplishments
As a highly effective advocate for the rights of children and women in armed conflict and post-conflict situations, Salah contributed to Security Council (SC) Resolution 1612 on child rights violations and Security Council (SC) resolution 1325 Women, Peace, and Security.

Awards and honors
In 2019, Salah was jointly recognized for her work in promoting the rights of children by Juzoor for Health and Social Development, an NGO based in Ramallah, Palestine, and the Palestinian Health Policy Forum where she received the Recognition and Gratitude in Advocating for Children's Rights Around the World Award.

More recently, on September 23, 2021, Salah was awarded the 2021 Peacemaker Award from the Center for Peace and Conflict Resolution (CPCR) at the J. Reuben Clark Law School at Brigham Young University.

References



Living people
Binghamton University alumni
State University of New York at Fredonia alumni
UNICEF people
Jordanian officials of the United Nations
Beirut College for Women alumni
Peacebuilding
Women's rights
Children's rights
Early childhood education
United Nations peacekeeping
Peace
Year of birth missing (living people)